Cuba–Serbia relations are the foreign relations between Cuba and Serbia. Cuba has an embassy in Belgrade and Serbia has an embassy in Havana. In the parliament of Serbia there is an active parliamentary group of friendship with Cuba. Cuba has supported Serbia in its stance towards Kosovo, considering Kosovo independence an "illegitimate act" and a "violation of norms of international law and principles of the United Nations Charter". Serbia supports Cuba at the United Nations in condemning the United States embargo.

See also
 Foreign relations of Cuba
 Foreign relations of Serbia
 Cuba–Yugoslavia relations
 Yugoslavia and the Non-Aligned Movement

References

External links

Bilateral relations of Serbia
Serbia